János Hegedűs (born 4 October 1996) is a Hungarian football player who plays for Vasas.

Club career
On 16 December 2022, Hegedűs signed with Vasas.

Club statistics

Updated to games played as of 20 May 2021.

References

External links
 MLSZ 
 HLSZ 
 

1996 births
Footballers from Budapest
Living people
Hungarian footballers
Hungary under-21 international footballers
Association football defenders
Szombathelyi Haladás footballers
Budaörsi SC footballers
Puskás Akadémia FC players
Diósgyőri VTK players
Vasas SC players
Nemzeti Bajnokság I players
Nemzeti Bajnokság II players